Agostino Gambino (6 July 1933 – 2 October 2021) was an Italian jurist and politician.

Biography
Gambino was Minister of Communications under the leadership of Lamberto Dini from 17 January 1995 to 17 May 1996. He held a Grand Cross of the Order of Merit of the Italian Republic.

A graduate of Heidelberg University and the University of Hamburg, he became a lawyer in 1958. He became a professor in 1965 and taught commercial and bankruptcy law at the University of Sassari, the Ca' Foscari University of Venice, and the Sapienza University of Rome. He became a professor emeritus in 2005.

Gambino became co-director of the Rivista di diritto commerciale and President of the Associazione Internazionale di Diritto delle Assicurazioni. Following the collapse of Banco Ambrosiano, he was appointed by the Vatican and Italian governments to co-chair the international commission to manage relations between the bank and the Institute for the Works of Religion.

In 1994, he became a part of a government commission nicknamed the "three wise men". The commission was placed in charge of mitigating conflicts between the private sector and properties of Prime Minister Silvio Berlusconi.

Agostino Gambino died in Rome on 2 October 2021 at the age of 88.

Works
L'assicurazione nella teoria dei contratti aleatori
Fondamenti di diritto commerciale
Impresa e società di persone
Società di capitali

References

1933 births
2021 deaths
20th-century Italian jurists
20th-century Italian politicians
Government ministers of Italy
Heidelberg University alumni
University of Hamburg alumni
Academic staff of the University of Sassari
Academic staff of the Ca' Foscari University of Venice
Academic staff of the Sapienza University of Rome
Politicians from Genoa
Knights Grand Cross of the Order of Merit of the Italian Republic
Communications ministers